Miloš Drizić (Serbian Cyrillic: Милош Дризић; born 31 December 1960) is a Serbian retired footballer.

References

1960 births
Living people
Sportspeople from Niš
Yugoslav footballers
Serbian footballers
Association football defenders
Yugoslav First League players
FK Rad players
FK Radnički Niš players
FK Sutjeska Nikšić players
Red Star Belgrade footballers
Rayo Vallecano players
Dunfermline Athletic F.C. players
Yugoslav expatriate footballers
Expatriate footballers in Spain
Expatriate footballers in Scotland
Yugoslav expatriate sportspeople in Spain
Yugoslav expatriate sportspeople in Scotland